Juan García Garza (5 February 1905 – 12 October 1973), nicknamed "El Peralvillo", was a Mexican actor and screenwriter. He wrote the screenplays of the films of comedian Germán Valdés, beginning in Tender Pumpkins (1949), and was credited for the street talk featured in Valdés's films.

Selected filmographyr

Juan Pistolas (1936)
El baúl macabro (1936) - Agente Gavilando
Allá en el Rancho Grande (1936) - Gabino (uncredited)
El impostor (1937)
Canción del alma (1938) - Julían - bandido
La Adelita (1938) - Eusebio Vargas
Padre de más de cuatro (1938) - Apostadore
La bestia negra (1939) - El Malcriado
El charro Negro (1940) - Esbirro de Emilio
Con su amable permiso (1940) - El deslenguado
El Zorro de Jalisco (1941) - Esbirro de Ernesto (uncredited)
The Unknown Policeman (1941) - Chusma (uncredited)
¡Ay Jalisco... no te rajes! (1943) - (uncredited)
The Circus (1943) - Acróbata (uncredited)
El misterioso señor Marquina (1943) - Villano (uncredited)
Romeo and Juliet (1943)
Espionaje en el golfo (1943)
El corsario negro (1944) - Iván, corsario (uncredited)
Me ha besado un hombre (1944) - Hombre celoso en cabaret
El mexicano (1944)
The Abandoned (1945) - Cliente de Margarita (uncredited)
Canaima (1945) - Esbirro de Cupira (uncredited)
A Day with the Devil (1945)
Amor de una vida (1946) - Campesino (uncredited)
El ahijado de la muerte (1946) - El coyote
Enamorada (1946) - Capt. Quiñones
The Pearl (1947) - Aid 2
Corridor of Mirrors (1947) - Compadre gordo
Río Escondido (1948) - Esbirro de Regino
The Pearl (1948)
¡Ay, Palillo, no te rajes! (1948) - (uncredited)
El casado casa quiere (1948) - Luis Conejo
Cara sucia (1949)
Medianoche (1949) - El norteño
Carta Brava (1949) - El Gorila
Rough But Respectable (1949) - Sanforizado
No me defiendas compadre (1949) - Sr. García
Novia a la medida (1949) - Tambor
Tender Pumpkins (1949)
Ventarrón (1949) - Esbirro de Ventarrón (uncredited)
The King of the Neighborhood (1950) - El Peralvillo
The Mark of the Skunk (1950) - Pitaya
Sinbad the Seasick (1950) - Juan el policía
El ciclón del Caribe (1950)
La ciudad perdida (1950)
Mi querido capitán (1950) - Octaviano
The Honesty of the Lock (1950)
Oh Darling! Look What You've Done! (1951) - Peralvillo
Los tres alegres compadres (1952) - (uncredited)
The Night Falls (1952) - Esbirro de Marcial
Chucho the Mended (1952) - Detective
Las tres alegres comadres (1952) - El norteño
The Beautiful Dreamer (1952) - Cavernario bruto
Snow White (1952)
You've Got Me By the Wing (1953) - Jefe de redacción
Here Come the Freeloaders (1953) - don Octaviano
The Island of Women (1953) - Isleño (uncredited)
Plunder of the Sun (1953) - Bartender (uncredited)
God Created Them (1953) - Asistente de licenciado
Blowing Wild (1953) - El Gavilan
The Unknown Mariachi (1953)
Contigo a la distancia (1954)
Sindicato de telemirones (1954) - (uncredited)
Vera Cruz (1954) - Pedro
Bluebeard (1955) - Director de periódico
Qué lindo Cha Cha Cha (1955)
The Tall Men (1955) - Luis
Look What Happened to Samson (1955)
Run for the Sun (1956) - Fernandez
Barefoot Sultan (1956)
The Bravados (1958) - Pepe Martínez Deputy Sheriff Guarding the Pass (uncredited)
Ten Days to Tulara (1958) - Piranha
Besos de arena (1959)
El ciclón (1959) - Octaviano García
El tesoro de Chucho el Roto (1960) - Octaviano
Vuelta al paraíso (1960) - Filemón
Vivo o muerto (1960) - Octaviano Garcia Garza
Los valientes no mueren (1962)
Sartana Does Not Forgive (1968)
The Undefeated (1969) - Col. Gomez
Misión cumplida (1970) - Policía (uncredited)
Something Big (1971) - Juan Garcia
El metiche (1972)
Los temibles (1977) - (final film role)

References

Bibliography 
 Monsiváis, Carlos (1997). Mexican Postcards. Verso.
 Hershfield, Joanne; Maciel, David R. (1999). Mexico's Cinema: A Century of Film and Filmmakers. Rowman & Littlefield Publishers.
 García Riera, Emilio (1986). Historia del cine mexicano. Secretaría de Educación Pública.

External links

1905 births
1973 deaths
Male actors from Tamaulipas
Mexican male film actors
20th-century Mexican male actors
People from Matamoros, Tamaulipas
20th-century Mexican screenwriters
20th-century Mexican male writers